The men's javelin throw at the 1950 European Athletics Championships was held in Brussels, Belgium, at Heysel Stadium on 26 and 27 August 1950.

Medalists

Results

Final
27 August

Qualification
26 August

Participation
According to an unofficial count, 16 athletes from 12 countries participated in the event.

 (1)
 (2)
 (2)
 (1)
 (1)
 (1)
 (1)
 (1)
 (2)
 (1)
 (1)
 (2)

References

Javelin throw
Javelin throw at the European Athletics Championships